Mário Fernandes da Graça Machungo (1 December 1940 – 17 February 2020) was a Mozambican politician. He was Planning Minister from at least 1984 to 1986, when he became Prime Minister of the country from 17 July 1986 to 16 December 1994. Mário Fernandes da Graca Machungo served as the Chairman of the Board and President of BIM Banco Internacional de Moçambique SA.

References

1940 births
2020 deaths
Agriculture ministers of Mozambique
Industry ministers of Mozambique